Shubh Kaamna is a 1983 Indian Hindi-language comedy drama film directed by K. Vishwanath and produced by V. V. Shastri. It stars Rakesh Roshan, Rati Agnihotri, Vinod Mehra, Sujit Kumar, Utpal Dutt, Om Prakash and music for the film was scored by R. D. Burman. The film is Hindi version of Viswanath's Telugu film Subhalekha.

The film was released on 14 October 1983.

Cast
 Rakesh Roshan as Ratan
 Rati Agnihotri as Sujata
 Vinod Mehra as Mr. Mehra
 Sujit Kumar as Jagannath
 Utpal Dutt as Vishwamitra Pandey
 Om Prakash as Vithalbhai
 Shammi as Ratan's Aunt
 Satyen Kappu as Bansi 
 Renuka as Nirmala
 Dinesh Thakur as Professor Khatri
 Paintal (comedian) as Dubey
 Sunil Dhawan as Chaubey
 Asrani as Khadkhade
 Kiran Vairale as Viji
 Ashalata Wabgaonkar as Sujata's Mother

Soundtrack
Lyrics: Anjaan

External links 
 

1980s Hindi-language films
Indian comedy-drama films
Films directed by K. Viswanath
Films scored by R. D. Burman
Hindi remakes of Telugu films
1983 comedy-drama films
1983 films
1983 comedy films
1983 drama films